Boris Aleksandrovich Dubrovsky (Russian:Борис Александрович Дубровский) (born November 22, 1958, Magnitogorsk, Chelyabinsk Region, RSFSR, USSR) is a Russian politician, metallurgical engineer, former CEO of the Magnitogorsk Iron and Steel Works (2011-2014). The current Governor of the Chelyabinsk region from September 24, 2014 (from January 15, 2014 to September 24, 2014 - acting). He was accused of embezzlement of state funds in October 2019.

References

External links
Biography

People from Magnitogorsk
Governors of Chelyabinsk Oblast
1958 births
Living people
United Russia politicians
21st-century Russian politicians